Citropsis is a genus of flowering plants in the citrus family, Rutaceae. They are known generally as African cherry oranges. They are native to Africa.

This genus is in the subfamily Aurantioideae, which also includes genus Citrus. It is in the tribe Citreae and subtribe Citrinae, which are known technically as the citrus fruit trees. Citropsis and the genus Atalantia are also called near-citrus fruit trees. The genus Citropsis is thought to be an ancestral group of genus Citrus. Fruit-bearing intergeneric hybrids have been established between Citropsis gabunensis and Citrus wakonai. Demand for the roots may lead to the overexploitation of the tree.

Taxa include:
Citropsis angolensis – Angola cherry orange
Citropsis articulata (syn. C. preussii, C. schweinfurthii) – West African cherry orange
Citropsis daweana – Mozambique cherry orange
Citropsis gabunensis – Gabon cherry orange
Citropsis gabunensis var. lacourtiana – Sankuru cherry orange
Citropsis gilletiana – Gillet's cherry orange
Citropsis latialata – Ikongu cherry orange
Citropsis le-testui – Le Testu's cherry orange
Citropsis mirabilis – Ivory Coast cherry orange
Citropsis noldeae
Citropsis tanakae – Sierra Leone cherry orange
Citropsis zenkeri – Zenker's cherry orange

References

External links
Sorting Citrus Relatives
Citropsis. The Plant List.

Aurantioideae
Aurantioideae genera
Flora of Africa